The following lists events that happened during 1952 in Australia.

Incumbents

Monarch – George VI (until 6 February), then Elizabeth II
Governor-General – Sir William McKell
Prime Minister – Robert Menzies
Chief Justice – Sir John Latham (until 7 April) then Sir Owen Dixon

State Premiers
Premier of New South Wales – James McGirr (until 2 April), then Joseph Cahill
Premier of Queensland – Ned Hanlon (until 17 January), then Vince Gair
Premier of South Australia – Thomas Playford IV
Premier of Tasmania – Robert Cosgrove
Premier of Victoria – John McDonald (until 28 October), then Thomas Hollway (until 31 October), then John McDonald (until 17 December), then John Cain I
Premier of Western Australia – Ross McLarty

State Governors
Governor of New South Wales – Sir John Northcott
Governor of Queensland – Sir John Lavarack
Governor of South Australia – Sir Charles Norrie (until 19 June)
Governor of Tasmania – Sir Ronald Cross, 1st Baronet
Governor of Victoria – Sir Dallas Brooks
Governor of Western Australia – Sir Charles Gairdner

Events
20 January – The first express trains run between Melbourne and Adelaide, following the completion of a railway between the two cities.
6 February – King George VI dies, and is succeeded as Queen of Australia by his daughter, Elizabeth II.
18 April – Owen Dixon becomes Chief Justice of the High Court of Australia.
29 April – The ANZUS Treaty between Australia, New Zealand and the United States comes into force.
14–18 June – Disastrous floods in the southeast corner leave 600 homeless and render a major rail line near Moss Vale unusable throughout the winter
The winter season is especially wet in the southeast of the continent, being the wettest on record in Melbourne and the fifth wettest on record in Sydney
1 September – Qantas Empire Airways commences the first air service between Australia and South Africa.
28 October – Premier of Victoria John McDonald resigns after the Victorian Legislative Council refuses supply. Thomas Hollway forms a short-lived ministry which lasts four days.
30 November – Lang Hancock discovers the world's largest deposit of iron ore in the Hamersley Range of Western Australia's Pilbara region.
6 December – A state election is held in Victoria.

Science and technology
3 October – The first British nuclear test in Australia, Operation Hurricane, commences on the Monte Bello Islands with the detonation of an atomic bomb of 25 kilotons yield.

Arts and literature

 28 April – Joan Sutherland makes her debut at Covent Garden
 William Dargie wins the Archibald Prize with his portrait of Essington Lewis
 Frank Hinder wins the Blake Prize for Religious Art with his work Flight into Egypt

Sport
 Athletics
 16 February – Robert Prentice wins his second men's national marathon title, clocking 3:19:26 in Melbourne.
 Olympics: Marjorie Jackson wins gold medals in the Women's 100m and 200m
 Olympics: Shirley Strickland wins the gold medal in the 80m Hurdles
 Cricket
 New South Wales wins the Sheffield Shield
 Cycling
 Olympics: Russell Mockridge wins the gold medal in the Men's 1000m Time Trial
 Olympics: Lionel Cox and Russell Mockridge win the gold medal in the Men's 2000m tandem
 Football
 14 and 16 June – for the only time in its history, the VFL plays matches for premiership points in country centres. Three other games are the first played interstate for premiership points since 1904 but flooding rains affect attendances and cause one game to be postponed and played under lights.
 Victorian Football League premiership: Geelong defeated Collingwood 86-40
 South Australian National Football League premiership: won by North Adelaide
 Rugby
 Bledisloe Cup: retained by the All Blacks
 Brisbane Rugby League premiership: Wests defeated Brothers 15-14
 New South Wales Rugby League premiership: Wests defeated South Sydney 22-12
 Golf
 Australian Open: won by Norman Von Nida
 Australian PGA Championship: won by William C Holder
 Horse Racing
 Peshawar wins the Caulfield Cup
 Hydrogen wins the Cox Plate
 Dalray wins the Melbourne Cup
 Motor Racing
 The Australian Grand Prix was held at Bathurst and won by Doug Whiteford driving a Talbot-Lago
 Swimming
 Olympics: John Davies wins the gold medal in the Men's 200m breaststroke
 Tennis
 Australian Open men's singles: Ken McGregor defeats Frank Sedgman 7-5 12-10 2–6 6-2
 Australian Open women's singles: Thelma Coyne Long defeats Helen Angwin 6-2 6-3
 Davis Cup: Australia defeats the United States 4–1 in the 1952 Davis Cup final
 Wimbledon: Ken McGregor and Frank Sedgman win the Men's Doubles
 Wimbledon: Frank Sedgman wins the Men's Singles
 Yachting
 Nocturne takes line honours and Ingrid wins on handicap in the Sydney to Hobart Yacht Race

Births
 2 January – Graeme Strachan (died 2001), singer
 6 February – Ric Charlesworth, sportsman
 1 March – Leigh Matthews, Australian Rules football player and coach
 6 March – Ian Cooke, field hockey player
 2 May – Campbell McComas (died 2005), impersonator and broadcaster
 6 June – Ross Stretton (died 2005), ballet dancer
 11 June – Tony Barnett, basketball player
 15 June – Clare Martin, Chief Minister of the Northern Territory
 25 June – Peter Farmer, hammer thrower
 28 June – Ken Gillespie, Vice Chief of the Defence Force (2005–2008), Chief of Army (2008–2011)
 28 July – Glenn A. Baker, music historian
 7 October – Graham Yallop, cricketer
 2 September – Pru Goward, politician
 4 September – Tom Maher, basketball coach
 12 October – Trevor Chappell, cricketer
 22 October – John Howard (Australian actor), stage and screen actor
 18 November – Peter Beattie, Premier of Queensland
 18 December – Frank Holden, entertainer
 19 December – Andrew Fraser, politician

Deaths

 12 June – Sir Harry Lawson, 27th Premier of Victoria (b. 1875)
 24 June – Sir George Pearce, Western Australian politician (b. 1870)
 22 July – James Vinton Smith, Victorian politician (b. 1897)
 27 July – Roland Pope, cricketer, ophthalmologist and philanthropist (b. 1864)
 14 September – Sir John McPhee, 27th Premier of Tasmania (b. 1878)
 4 October – Sir Keith Murdoch, journalist, businessman and news proprietor (b. 1885)
 12 October – Madge Connor, police officer (born in Ireland) (b. 1874)
 28 October – Billy Hughes, 7th Prime Minister of Australia (born in the United Kingdom) (b. 1862)
 30 November – Elizabeth Kenny, nurse (b. 1880)
 14 December – Colin William Wright, cattle breeder, grazier, local government councillor and local government head (b. 1867)

See also
 List of Australian films of the 1950s

References

 
Australia
Years of the 20th century in Australia